Arne Wilhelmsen (15 June 192911 April 2020) was a Norwegian billionaire businessman, the co-founder of Royal Caribbean Cruises.

Wilhelmsen was born in June 1929, and earned a bachelor's degree from Harvard University.

When he died, his net worth was estimated at US$1.5 billion.

Wilhelmsen was married, with three children and lived in Oslo, Norway. He died on 11 April 2020, in Palma de Mallorca, Spain. He was 90.

References

1929 births
2020 deaths
Businesspeople from Oslo in shipping
Harvard University alumni
Norwegian billionaires
Norwegian company founders